Lamont is a city in Buchanan County, Iowa, United States. The population was 429 at the time of the 2020 census.

History
Lamont was first settled in 1852. A post office was established here in 1875. The Chicago Great Western Railway made it a stop on the railroad in 1886.

Geography
Lamont is located at  (42.600022, -91.641186).

Demographics

2010 census
As of the census of 2010, there were 461 people, 193 households, and 121 families living in the city. The racial makeup of the city was 98.3% White, 0.2% African American, 0.4% Native American, 0.4% Asian, and 0.7% from two or more races. Hispanic or Latino of any race were 0.4% of the population.

There were 193 households, of which 30.6% had children under the age of 18 living with them, 47.2% were married couples living together, 13.0% had a female householder with no husband present, 2.6% had a male householder with no wife present, and 37.3% were non-families. 33.2% of all households were made up of individuals, and 14.5% had someone living alone who was 65 years of age or older. The average household size was 2.39 and the average family size was 3.06.

The median age in the city was 37.7 years. 28.9% of residents were under the age of 18; 6.1% were between the ages of 18 and 24; 23.4% were from 25 to 44; 27.9% were from 45 to 64; and 13.7% were 65 years of age or older. The gender makeup of the city was 51.0% male and 49.0% female.

2000 census
As of the census of 2000, there were 503 people, 213 households, and 141 families living in the city. The racial makeup of the city was 100.00% White. Hispanic or Latino of any race were 0.40% of the population.

There were 213 households, out of which 30.0% had children under the age of 18 living with them, 53.5% were married couples living together, 10.8% had a female householder with no husband present, and 33.8% were non-families. 30.5% of all households were made up of individuals, and 13.6% had someone living alone who was 65 years of age or older. The average household size was 2.36 and the average family size was 2.94.

In the city, the population was spread out, with 26.8% under the age of 18, 8.5% from 18 to 24, 27.0% from 25 to 44, 21.7% from 45 to 64, and 15.9% who were 65 years of age or older. The median age was 37 years. For every 100 females, there were 97.3 males. For every 100 females age 18 and over, there were 91.7 males.

The median income for a household in the city was $30,000, and the median income for a family was $38,125. Males had a median income of $27,639 versus $21,250 for females. The per capita income for the city was $15,201. About 9.3% of families and 11.1% of the population were below the poverty line, including 9.1% of those under age 18 and 14.1% of those age 65 or over.

2008 storm
see Late-May 2008 tornado outbreak sequence
While Parkersburg suffered an EF-5 tornado, Lamont suffered a stalled thunderstorm system that dropped seven inches of rain in one hour, and effectively flooded all but two basements of the city, and five first floors. Most homeowners lacked flood insurance and have discovered that their homeowners insurance does not cover this damage.

School district
Lamont is part of the Starmont system, where  STrawberry Point, ARlington and LaMONT form a portmanteau describing the consolidated school district: Starmont High School (see Strawberry Point, Iowa, Arlington, Iowa and Lamont, Iowa).

References

Cities in Buchanan County, Iowa
Cities in Iowa
1852 establishments in Iowa
Populated places established in 1852